Rajiv Surendra  is a Canadian actor, artist, and writer. He is best known for his portrayal of Kevin Gnapoor in the 2004 teen comedy film Mean Girls and for his 2016 memoir, The Elephants in My Backyard, which chronicles his bid to win the lead role in the 2012 film Life of Pi.

Career

Acting
As an actor, Surendra played Chuck Singh in the third season of the YTV sitcom System Crash (2000), Max in the comedy film Fast Food High (2003), Barney Oscarson in an episode of Canadian teen comedy-drama television series Radio Free Roscoe (2003), Kevin Gnapoor in Mean Girls (2004), and Jajeev in the short film 6 ft. in 7 min. (2005).

Writing
In 2016, Surendra published the book The Elephants in My Backyard, a memoir of his failed attempt to win the lead role in the 2012 film Life of Pi. He read Life of Pi for the first time on the set of Mean Girls in 2004 and noticed many parallels between his own life and that of the novel's lead character, Piscine Molitor "Pi" Patel, including the fact that Surendra himself grew up in a home adjacent to the Toronto Zoo. To prepare for the role, Surendra temporarily dropped out of school at the University of Toronto and travelled to Pondicherry, India to learn the specific dialect of the character. Upon returning to Canada and going back to school, Surendra learned how to swim. While he did meet with the casting director of the film, Surendra was not selected to play the role of Pi. He reflected on these experiences in The Elephants in My Backyard. The book was longlisted for the 2017 edition of Canada Reads and Surendra was nominated for the Kobo Emerging Writer Prize in 2017.

Fine arts and crafts
Surendra is the founder of Letters in Ink, a bespoke calligraphy and graphic design service based in Manhattan. He uses pen and ink and chalk to create art and branding for restaurants and other businesses.

While working at Black Creek Pioneer Village in Toronto as a teenager, Surendra developed an interest in traditional crafts and antiques. As a result, he practices a number of traditional arts and crafts, including letter writing, calligraphy, bookbinding, and painting. He is an apprentice to Connecticut-based potter Guy Wolff, whose work has appeared in Martha Stewart Living magazine.

In 2020, Surendra created a two-video YouTube series on the art of letter writing for the Morgan Library & Museum. In 2021, he appeared in a series of videos posted on the HGTV Handmade YouTube channel, highlighting his personal collection of handmade objects, chalk art, bookbinding, and paper marbling.

Personal life
Surendra's parents immigrated to Canada from Sri Lanka. He grew up in Toronto, in a neighbourhood close to Toronto Zoo. He attended Wexford Collegiate School for the Arts as a musical theatre student and performer, graduating in 2003.

Filmography

Film

Television

References

External links
 

1980s births
21st-century Canadian male actors
21st-century Canadian non-fiction writers
21st-century Canadian painters
21st-century ceramists
21st-century memoirists
Artists from Toronto
Canadian ceramists
Canadian expatriates in the United States
Canadian male child actors
Canadian male film actors
Canadian male painters
Canadian male television actors
Canadian memoirists
Canadian people of Indian descent
Canadian people of Tamil descent
Canadian writers of Asian descent
Canadian gay actors
Canadian gay artists
Canadian gay writers
Living people
Male actors from Toronto
Tamil male actors
Writers from Toronto
Year of birth missing (living people)
21st-century Canadian male artists
21st-century Canadian LGBT people